Without a Dowry is a 1937 Soviet drama film directed by Yakov Protazanov and starring Nina Alisova. It was based on Alexander Ostrovsky's play Without a Dowry (1878).

Cast
 Nina Alisova – Larisa Dmitriyevna Ogudalova
 Olga Pyzhova – Kharita Ignatyevna Ogudalova
 Anatoly Ktorov – Sergei Sergeyevich Paratov
 Mikhail Klimov – Mokiy Parmyonych Knurov
 Boris Tenin – Vasily Danilych Vozhevatov
 Vladimir Balikhin – Yuly Kapitonych Karandyshev
 Vladimir Popov – Arkady "Robinzon" Shablitsev
 Varvara Ryzhova – Yefrosinya Potapovna

External links

1937 films
Gorky Film Studio films
Soviet black-and-white films
Films directed by Yakov Protazanov
Soviet films based on plays
Films based on works by Alexander Ostrovsky
Soviet romantic drama films
1937 romantic drama films